Keith Knight may refer to:

 Keith Knight (cartoonist) (born 1966), American cartoonist and musician
 Keith Knight (actor) (1956–2007), Canadian actor/voice actor
 Keith Knight (footballer) (born 1969), English footballer